Karan Singh  (born 9 March 1931) is an Indian politician and philosopher. He is the son of the last ruling Maharaja of the princely state of Jammu and Kashmir, Sir Hari Singh. He was the prince regent of Jammu and Kashmir until 1952. From 1952 to 1965 he was the Sadr-i-Riyasat (President) of the state of Jammu and Kashmir in the Republic of India. He is the chairperson trustee of the Dharmarth Trust of Jammu and Kashmir which maintains 175 temples in north India and works in other areas such as historical preservation.

Singh was a member of India's Upper House of Parliament, the Rajya Sabha, representing the national capital territory of Delhi. He is a senior member of the Indian National Congress party who served successively as President (Sadr-i-Riyasat) and Governor of the former state of Jammu and Kashmir. He was a life trustee and president of India International Center. He was elected chancellor of Banaras Hindu University for three terms until 2018 when he was succeeded by Giridhar Malaviya. He has been a prospective presidential candidate over the years.

Early and personal life
Yuvraj Karan Singh was born at the Martinez Hotel, Cannes, France, into the Dogra dynasty. He was the only son of Sir Hari Singh, Maharaja of Jammu and Kashmir.

Singh was educated at Doon School, Dehra Dun, a boarding school, which represented a departure from the usual practise of princes being educated by tutors at home. The school was very elite, but it nevertheless meant that Karan Singh shared the classroom (though not the hostel) with boys from non-royal backgrounds, and received a standard education. Unusually for the scion of an Indian royal family, he then enrolled in a college for a graduate degree, receiving first a B.A. degree from Jammu and Kashmir University, Srinagar, and subsequently an M.A. degree in Political Science and a PhD degree from University of Delhi.

In 1950, the 19-year-old Karan Singh was married to 13-year-old Yasho Rajya Lakshmi, daughter of a nobleman belonging to the Rana family of Nepal. Her father, General Sharada Shumsher Jung Bahadur Rana, was a senior army officer and the son of Mohan Shumsher Jang Bahadur Rana, the last Rana Prime Minister of Nepal. The match, arranged by their families in the usual Indian way, was entirely harmonious and lasted all their lives. The couple had three children:

Yuvraj Vikramaditya Singh, elder son and crown prince; married Chitrangada Scindia, the daughter of Madhavrao Scindia of Gwalior, in 1987.
Ajatshatru Singh, second son; took to politics, was elected to the state assembly from the Nagrota constituency and became a minister in the state government. His wife is the daughter of an army officer.
 Jyotsna Singh, only daughter, married to Dhirendra Singh Chauhan, from a Chauhan family belonging to Mainpuri in Uttar Pradesh.

Political career

In 1949, at age of eighteen, Singh was appointed as the Prince Regent of Jammu and Kashmir state after his father stepped down as the ruler, following the state's accession to India. From that point, he served successively as regent, the Sadr-i-Riyasat, and the first governor of the state of Jammu and Kashmir from 1965 to 1967.

On August 8, 1953 as the President (Sadr-i-Riyasat) of Jammu and Kashmir, Karan Singh backed a coup d'etat against the elected Prime Minister Sheikh Abdullah, allegedly for harboring independent ambitions for Kashmir, which led to the imprisonment of Abdullah for eleven years following the Kashmir Conspiracy Case.

In 1967, he resigned as Governor of Jammu and Kashmir, and became the youngest-ever member of the Union Cabinet, holding the portfolios of Tourism and Civil Aviation between 1967 and 1973. Two years later, he voluntarily surrendered his privy purse, which he had been entitled to since the death of his father in 1961. He placed the entire sum into a charitable trust named after his parents.

In the 26th amendment to the Constitution of India promulgated in 1971, the Government of India, of which Karan Singh was a Union cabinet minister, abolished all official symbols of princely India, including titles, privileges, and remuneration (privy purses). During the conclusion of the Cold War, he was India's ambassador to the USA. Singh received the Padma Vibhushan in 2005.In 1971, he was sent as an envoy to the Eastern Bloc nations to explain India's position with regard to East Pakistan, then engaged in civil war with West Pakistan. He attempted to resign following an aircraft crash in 1973, but the resignation was not accepted. The same year, he became the Minister for Health and Family planning, serving in this post until 1977.
Following the Emergency, Karan Singh was elected to the Lok Sabha from Udhampur in 1977 on a Congress ticket [the party had not split into Congress(I) and Congress(U) factions till then], and became Minister of Education and Culture in 1979 in Charan Singh's cabinet, representing Congress(U), which had split from Indira's Congress. Notably, Charan Singh became Prime Minister after the fall of Janata Party government headed by Morarji Desai. And Charan Singh himself resigned without facing Parliament even for a day as he was not sure of having a confidence motion passed in his favour. Karan Singh contested the 1980 Lok Sabha election on a Congress(U) ticket and won. In 1989–1990, he served as Indian Ambassador to the US, and this experience became the subject of a book he wrote, "Brief Sojourn".

From 1967 to 1984, Karan Singh was a member of the Lok Sabha. In 1984, he contested the Lok Sabha polls as an independent candidate from Jammu but lost the election. He was a member of the Rajya Sabha from 30 November 1996 to 12 August 1999, representing National Conference, a Muslim dominated party active in Jammu and Kashmir. Later, he was a Rajya Sabha member from 28 January 2000 to 27 January 2018 representing INC. He is known for switching his loyalties from one political party to another quite frequently. He has served as Chancellor of Banaras Hindu University, Jammu and Kashmir University, Jawaharlal Nehru University, and NIIT University.

Later life 
He has been engaged by Sansad TV (a merged Global TV Channel of Lok Sabha TV and Rajya Sabha TV) as a Guest Anchor along with some other senior celebrated experts from diverse fields such as Bibek Debroy, Amitabh Kant, Shashi Tharoor, Hemant Batra, Maroof Raza and Sanjeev Sanyal to present some flagship programmes.

Academic career 

Karan Singh served as the chancellor of Banaras Hindu University for three terms up until 2018. In 2008, he awarded an honorary doctorate to the then prime minister Manmohan Singh, and in 2016, he was asked by university administration to award an honorary doctorate to prime minister Modi, that the prime minister declined.

Honours and awards 
India:

  Padma Vibhushan (2005).

 Servare et Manere:

  Memorial Medal of Tree of Peace. International peace award granted by a Slovak non-governmental organization (2021).

Views

On population 
"In 1974, I led the Indian delegation to the World Population Conference in Bucharest, where my statement that 'development is the best contraceptive' became widely known and oft quoted. I must admit that 20 years later I am inclined to reverse this, and my position now is that 'contraception is the best development'.”

Bibliography 

Towards A New India (1974)
Population, Poverty and the Future of India (1975)
One Man's World (1986)
Essays on Hinduism. Ratna Sagar. 1987. .
Humanity at the Crossroads, with Daisaku Ikeda. Oxford University Press, 1988.
Autobiography (2 vols.)(1989)
Brief Sojourn (1991)
Hymn to Shiva and Other Poems (1991)
The Transition to a Global Society (1991)
Mountain of Shiva (1994)
Autobiography. Oxford University Press, 1994. .
Hinduism. Sterling Publishers Pvt. Ltd, 2005. 
Mundaka Upanishad: The Bridge to Immortality.
Ten Gurus of the Sikhs Their Life Story, Tr. into English Pramila Naniwadekar & Moreshwar Naniwadekar.
Nehru's Kashmir. Wisdom Tree. .
A Treasury of Indian Wisdom. Penguin Ananda, 2010. .
An Examined Life ed. Raghav Verma. Harper Collins, 2019.

See also

Instrument of Accession (Jammu and Kashmir) to the Dominion of India
List of topics on the land and the people of Jammu and Kashmir

References

 Detailed Profile: Dr. Karan Singh Government of India portal

Further reading

 An Examined Life: Essays and Reflections by Karan Singh, ed. Raghav Verma. Harper Collins, 2019.

External links

 Dr. Karan Singh's Official Website
 Film: I Believe: Universal Values for a Global Society with Dr. Singh and by Raja Choudhury.
 Proclamation of May 1, 1951 on Jammu & Kashmir Constituent Assembly by Yuvraj (Crown Prince) Karan Singh from the Official website of Government of Jammu and Kashmir, India

1931 births
Scholars from Jammu and Kashmir
Indian religious writers
Living people
The Doon School alumni
Delhi University alumni
Governors of Jammu and Kashmir
Academic staff of Jawaharlal Nehru University
Recipients of the Padma Vibhushan in public affairs
Ambassadors of India to the United States
Maharajas of Jammu and Kashmir
Indian Hindus
Dogra people
Indian autobiographers
Indian National Congress politicians from Jammu and Kashmir
Rajya Sabha members from Delhi
India MPs 1967–1970
India MPs 1971–1977
India MPs 1977–1979
Lok Sabha members from Jammu and Kashmir
Health ministers of India
Civil aviation ministers of India
Education Ministers of India
20th-century Indian historians
Indian political writers
Writers from Jammu and Kashmir
Rajya Sabha members from Jammu and Kashmir
India MPs 1980–1984
University of Kashmir alumni
Indian National Congress (U) politicians